David Bartolomeu Dias (born 21 April 1969 in Luanda) is a former Angolan basketball power forward. He competed at the 1992, 1996 and 2000 Summer Olympics with the Angola national basketball team.

References

External links
 

1969 births
Living people
Angolan expatriate basketball people in Portugal
Angolan men's basketball players
1990 FIBA World Championship players
Basketball players at the 1992 Summer Olympics
Basketball players at the 1996 Summer Olympics
Basketball players at the 2000 Summer Olympics
C.D. Primeiro de Agosto men's basketball players
Centers (basketball)
Olympic basketball players of Angola
Power forwards (basketball)
Basketball players from Luanda
1986 FIBA World Championship players
1994 FIBA World Championship players